Bernard Rein (born Bernhard Rein; 19 November 1897 – 9 November 1976) was an Estonian football player and coach.

Rein began playing football in 1914 with Olümpia. He fought in the Estonian War of Independence and graduated from Tallinn Tehnikum. From 1921 to 1932, he played for Sport and TJK, winning the Estonian Football Championship six times.

He made his international debut for Estonia in 1922 and played in the men's tournament at the 1924 Summer Olympics. Rein made a total of 27 appearances for the national team, including 19 as captain.

After retiring as a player, Rein became a coach and coached Estonia from 1936 to 1938.

During World War II, Rein fled to Sweden in 1944 where he died in 1976 at the age of 78.

References

External links
 
 
 
 
 

1897 births
1976 deaths
Footballers from Tallinn
People from the Governorate of Estonia
Association football midfielders
Estonian footballers
Estonia international footballers
Olympic footballers of Estonia
Footballers at the 1924 Summer Olympics
Estonia national football team managers
Estonian football managers
Estonian World War II refugees
Estonian emigrants to Sweden